Dinah Sings, Previn Plays is a 1960 album by Dinah Shore, accompanied by André Previn.

Track listing
For the 2006 Capitol Records Reissue, 69802

 "The Man I Love" (George Gershwin, Ira Gershwin) – 3:19
 "April in Paris" (Vernon Duke, Yip Harburg) – 2:58
 "That Old Feeling" (Lew Brown, Sammy Fain) – 3:13
 "I've Got You Under My Skin" (Cole Porter) – 2:43
 "Then I'll Be Tired of You" (Harburg, Arthur Schwartz) – 3:23
 "Sleepy Time Gal" (Joseph Reed Alden, Raymond B. Egan, Ange Lorenzo, Richard Whiting) – 2:42
 "My Melancholy Baby" (Ernie Burnett, George Norton) – 3:42
 "My Funny Valentine" (Lorenz Hart, Richard Rodgers) – 3:36
 "It Had to Be You" (Isham Jones, Gus Kahn) – 3:26
 "I'll Be Seeing You" (Fain, Irving Kahal) – 3:10
 "If I Had You" (James Campbell, Reginald Connelly, Ted Shapiro) – 3:22

Bonus tracks
"Like Someone in Love" (Sonny Burke, Jimmy Van Heusen) – 3:00
 "Stars Fell on Alabama" (Mitchell Parish, Frank Perkins) – 2:54
 "While We're Young" (William Engvick, Morty Palitz, Alec Wilder) – 3:08
 "The Man I Love" – 4:17

Personnel
André Previn – piano
Dinah Shore – vocals
Frank Capp – drums
Red Mitchell – double bass

References

1960 albums
Dinah Shore albums
André Previn albums
Albums produced by Voyle Gilmore
Capitol Records albums
Collaborative albums